Leslie William Bogie (2 May 1911 – 14 November 1983) was an Australian rules footballer who played with Footscray in the Victorian Football League (VFL).

Family
The son of William Smith Bogie (1882-1970), and Maud Alice Bogie (1885-1963), née Robins, Leslie William Bogie was born at Castlemaine, Victoria on 2 May 1911.

He married Rita Alice Askew (1918-2013) on 11 January 1941.

Death
He died at Castlemaine, Victoria on 14 November 1983.

Notes

References
 
 Bogie Cleared to Yarraville, The Age, (Wednesday, 9 June 1937), p.19.

External links 
 
 
 Les Bogie, at Boyles Football Photos.
 Les Bogie, at The VFA Project.

1911 births
1983 deaths
Australian rules footballers from Victoria (Australia)
Castlemaine Football Club players
Western Bulldogs players
Yarraville Football Club players